The 2016 Northern Arizona Lumberjacks football team represented Northern Arizona University in the 2016 NCAA Division I FCS football season. They were led by 19th-year head coach Jerome Souers and played their home games at the Walkup Skydome. They were a member of the Big Sky Conference. They finished the season 5–6, 4–4 in Big Sky play to finish in a tie for sixth place.

Schedule

Source: Official Schedule

Game summaries

at Arizona State

at Western Illinois

New Mexico Highlands

Eastern Washington

at Northern Colorado

at Montana State

Idaho State

Montana

at Weber State

at North Dakota

Southern Utah

Ranking movements

References

Northern Arizona
Northern Arizona Lumberjacks football seasons
Northern Arizona Lumberjacks football